Krutye Gorki is a rural locality (a village) in Oktyabrskoye Rural Settlement, Vyaznikovsky District, Vladimir Oblast, Russia. The population was 265 as of 2010.

Geography 
Krutye Gorki is located 16 km south of Vyazniki (the district's administrative centre) by road. Vorobyovka is the nearest rural locality.

References 

Rural localities in Vyaznikovsky District